"Cannonball" is a song written by Duane Eddy and Lee Hazlewood and performed by Eddy. It reached #15 on the Billboard Hot 100,  #22 on the R&B chart, #2 on the UK Singles Chart in 1958. and appeared on his 1958 album, Have 'Twangy' Guitar Will Travel.

The song was recorded at Audio Recorders recording studio in Phoenix, Arizona, produced by Lee Hazlewood and Lester Sill.

Other versions
Ace Cannon, on his debut 1962 album, "Tuff" Sax.

References

1958 songs
1958 singles
Songs written by Duane Eddy
Songs written by Lee Hazlewood
Duane Eddy songs
Song recordings produced by Lee Hazlewood
Song recordings produced by Lester Sill
Jamie Records singles